James W. Goll (born July 3, 1952), formerly known as Jim Goll, is the Director of Prayer Storm (founded 2009), Coordinator of Encounters Alliance, and author. He is the co-founder of Encounters Network. He is an instructor at the Wagner Leadership Institute and is also a member of the Harvest International Ministries apostolic team. His ministry focuses on prophecy and some have called him a prophet (one of the Kansas City Prophets). 

 · https://godencounters.com/james-w-goll-bio/

Goll continues his public ministry, teaching online classes, and producing a podcast entitled "God Encounters Today" and a blog with Charisma. He is an adviser and a voice in the global prayer and prophetic movements.

See also 
Prophecy
Apostolic-Prophetic Movement
Faith healing
International House of Prayer

References

Further reading

 Harvest International
 Kairos Magazine
 Wagner Leadership Institute
 Extreme Prophetic
 Tobia, P.J. "Prophets Rising". Nashville Scene, Nashville: 2006.

1952 births
20th-century Christian mystics
American Christian mystics
Living people
Prophets
Protestant mystics